The Union of Tito's Left Forces (Sojuz na Titovi levi sili) is a communist party in North Macedonia. The party follows the ideology of Titoism and its leader is Slobodan Ugrinovski.

References

See also
 Titoism
 Josip Broz Tito

Communist parties in North Macedonia
Political parties established in 2005
2005 establishments in the Republic of Macedonia